Buckton Roman Fort is an archaeological site at Buckton, about 1 mile south-west of Leintwardine, in Herefordshire. England. it is a scheduled monument.

Description
The Roman vicus Bravonium was established at present-day Leintwardine about AD 70; a fort was built there about AD 160, and abandoned about AD 196.

The fort at Buckton is just above the floodplain of the River Teme. The remains, entirely buried, were observed and photographed from the air by W A Baker in 1959, during a drought. There was excavation between then and 1961, from which a chronology was established.

Originally there were turf ramparts and timber gate towers, constructed about AD 80. The fort replaced an earlier fort nearby at Jay Lane. It is thought that this site had a better water supply; traces of a bath house were found to the east of the fort.

It housed a cavalry unit. There were gates of width , inside stone gate towers; it was the largest gatehouse of an auxiliary fort known in Britain. The fort was later dismantled, perhaps to build the fort at Bravonium, and was abandoned in AD 130.

It is presumably associated with the larger fort, and may have been an earlier temporary fort.

References

Roman sites in England
Scheduled monuments in Herefordshire
Archaeological sites in Herefordshire